Manresa Road is a street in Chelsea, London, that has been called "the third most expensive street in England".

Location
The street runs roughly north to south, from Chelsea Square to King's Road.

The Hampshire School is based at no 15.

History 
The former Chelsea College is now apartments.

The Trafalgar Studios was a set three-storey, 15-unit block of purpose-built artists' studios, built in 1878 by John Brass. Notable artists who have lived there include Henry Jamyn Brooks, Albert Arthur Toft, Edward Gordon Craig, Frank Brangwyn, Mervyn Peake, and Clifford Hall.

In December 2015, it was considered to be the third most expensive street in England, with an average property price of £7,359,000, according to research from Lloyds Bank, based on Land Registry data.

In April 2015, The Guardian reported that a British financier in his late 30s had agreed to buy an apartment at no.21, a 19th-century building, formerly part of King's College London, for £27 million, making it the world's most expensive apartment. The building had been owned by Bernie Ecclestone, before being acquired and developed by Christian and Nick Candy.

Notable residents
Ernest Dade and Nelson Dawson rented studios at Manresa Road.
Frank Dobson, sculptor, had a studio there between the wars.

References

Chelsea, London
Streets in the Royal Borough of Kensington and Chelsea
King's Road, Chelsea, London